Cease Fire is a 1985 American independent war drama film directed by David Nutter (in his directing debut) and written by George Fernandez, based on his stage play Vietnam Trilogy. It stars Don Johnson and Lisa Blount.

Plot
A Vietnam Veteran fifteen years after returning home, married and with children suddenly finds himself reliving the horror of Vietnam. He's out of work and searching for a new job along with another Vet named Luke. Luke is separated but hoping to get back with his wife one day. Tim the main character sees the enemy in his house one night as he crawls around with a knife searching for the intruder. His young son has gotten up to get a glass of water and sees his father crawling through the darkness, knife in hand searching to the enemy. Horrified he wets his pants and is just missed being the enemy. Paula, Tim's wife realizes that her husband needs help and knows it's something to do with the War. She joins a Woman's Group, desperate for help. Tim reluctantly joins the Men's group but doesn't say a word. Luke comes to him one day excited that he and his wife are going to get together again. That night Tim calls to find out that Luke was served with divorce papers. Luke is sitting in his small apartment with his gun in hand. He sees Charlie and he's at the Wire, they're going to overrun the unit there's no chance. Tim hears the gun go off and runs to his friends side, but it's too late. He watches them carry his body away. At Luke's Funeral he meets the wife and son. Paula tries to talk to him but he's lost, his mind is so confused he goes to look for himself. That night while Paula is throwing out the garbage she sees Tim sitting by the children's swing set and she goes to him. She's trying to understand but can't. Tim explodes and tells her she's going to the prom while he's out in the woods. Then the mortars start walking in Tim falls to the ground in pain reliving Vietnam in front of his wife. Paula sees her family falling apart and won't stand for it. She attacks him screaming her love and need for him to come back to the family. She and the children need their father. Tim is snapped out of it and Paula falls crying into his arms. The Next day, Tim goes to the Vets office to talk about his experience in Vietnam. They were on patrol, Tim and three others, His friend Badman was with him. They were out looking for a supposed POW camp. They find a well and in the well are the bodies of 26 Americans, their hands tied behind their backs and a bullet hole in their heads. The Rats are having a field day eating the rotting flesh. Suddenly, its and ambush as Mortars come walking in and machine gun fire opens up. Rafer is killed and they make a run for it, but the mortars follow behind them. A rescue Huey is hanging above the ground waiting for them. Gil is hit, Tim picks him up and makes to the Helicopter, then turns to see Badman crawling toward them. Tim tells the chopper to wait but the mortar fire is intensifying. It's beginning to lift off. Badman is screaming for Tim who is begging the crew to go back but to no avail. He is going to watch his friend be captured tortured and mutilated unless he can do something.

Cast 
  Don Johnson as  Tim Murphy
  Lisa Blount as Paula Murphy
  Robert F. Lyons as Luke
  Richard Chaves as Badman
  Chris Noel as Wendy
  Josh Segal  as Ronnie Murphy
  Andrew Garrett  as Baby
   Christina Wilfong  as Ellen 
  Rick Richards  as Robbs
   Richard Styles  as Ritchie
   Jorge Gil  as Sanchez 
   John Archie  as Rafer

References

External links 

1985 films
1985 directorial debut films
1985 drama films
1985 independent films
1980s war drama films
1980s English-language films
American films based on plays
American independent films
American war drama films
Films about post-traumatic stress disorder
Films about veterans
Films directed by David Nutter
Vietnam War films
1980s American films